Potter Heigham Bridge Halt was a railway station on the Midland and Great Northern Joint Railway which was opened to serve the boating traffic on the River Thurne. It was more conveniently situated to the Norfolk village of Potter Heigham than Potter Heigham station itself.

History

Opened by the Midland and Great Northern Joint Railway, the station was closed as a wartime measure before passing briefly to the Eastern Region of British Railways on nationalisation in 1948 only to be closed by British Railways in 1959.

The Station Today 
Barely anything remains of the station except the station platform wall.

References

 
 
 

Disused railway stations in Norfolk
Former Midland and Great Northern Joint Railway stations
Railway stations in Great Britain opened in 1933
Railway stations in Great Britain closed in 1939
Railway stations in Great Britain opened in 1948
Railway stations in Great Britain closed in 1959